Abraham Coronado Tafoya (born 28 January 1992) is a Mexican professional footballer who plays as a winger for Durango.

Club career
Coronado began his career with Club Deportivo Guadalajara. Coronado scored his first professional goal against Querétaro in a 3–1 loss for Chivas.

References

External links

1992 births
Living people
Footballers from Jalisco
People from Ocotlán, Jalisco
Association football fullbacks
Mexican expatriate footballers
Mexico youth international footballers
C.D. Guadalajara footballers
Irapuato F.C. footballers
Coras de Nayarit F.C. footballers
Deportivo Toluca F.C. players
Club Necaxa footballers
Loros UdeC footballers
Venados F.C. players
Liga MX players
Ascenso MX players
Mexican expatriate sportspeople in Spain
Expatriate footballers in Spain
Mexican footballers